Sarnia Transit provides public transportation within the City of Sarnia and the independent village of Point Edward in Ontario, Canada. This includes conventional bus transit, transportation of people with disabilities (Care-A-Van), transportation support for major events and charter services.

Routes
The following services are provided by Sarnia Transit's Monday to Friday Day Schedule:

See also

 Public transport in Canada

References

External links 
 Transit maps & routes

 City of Sarnia

Transit agencies in Ontario
Transport in Sarnia